The 1999 Malaysian Grand Prix (formally the 1999 Petronas Malaysian Grand Prix) was a Formula One race held on 17 October 1999 at the new Sepang International Circuit near Sepang, Malaysia. It was the fifteenth race of the 1999 Formula One World Championship.

The 56-lap race was won by Eddie Irvine, driving a Ferrari, after starting from second position. Teammate Michael Schumacher, in his first race back after breaking his leg at the British Grand Prix at Silverstone, finished second having started from pole position, while Mika Häkkinen finished third in a McLaren-Mercedes. The win gave Irvine a four-point lead over Häkkinen in the Drivers' Championship with one race remaining, though it would turn out to be his 4th and last F1 victory.

Report
This was the first Malaysian Grand Prix since a Formula Holden event in 1995, but the first time at Formula One world championship level. Michael Schumacher returned to Formula One having recovered from his broken leg, and took pole position by nearly a second from Ferrari team-mate Eddie Irvine, with the McLarens of David Coulthard and Mika Häkkinen third and fourth respectively. At the start, Schumacher led away from Irvine, Coulthard, Häkkinen and Rubens Barrichello. On lap 4, Schumacher slowed and allowed Irvine to pass him, then proceeded to block the McLarens. Coulthard forced his way past Schumacher on lap 5 and pursued Irvine for the lead, only to retire on lap 15 with fuel pressure problems.

Back in second place, Schumacher slowed again in order to allow Irvine to build an advantage. Then, as the first round of pit stops loomed, Schumacher accelerated the pace in order to stay ahead of Häkkinen. Realising this, McLaren gambled on giving Häkkinen half a tank of fuel, hoping it would be enough to get him out of the pits ahead of Schumacher. The gamble failed, as Schumacher stayed ahead of the Finn and proceeded to block him again, allowing Irvine to extend his lead to 20 seconds.

Irvine's lead was not big enough for him to stay ahead after his second pit stop, but Ferrari were sure that Häkkinen would have to stop again. He did, emerging in fourth place behind Johnny Herbert in the Stewart. Schumacher slowed once again to allow Irvine to retake the lead, while Häkkinen forced his way past Herbert for third. Irvine duly took the chequered flag one second ahead of Schumacher, with Häkkinen a further eight seconds back.

Immediately after the race, the Ferraris were disqualified due to an infringement on their bargeboards. This meant that Häkkinen and McLaren were effectively handed their respective championships by default. However, Ferrari appealed against the FIA's decision in court and both drivers were subsequently reinstated.

With one race remaining, Irvine led the Drivers' Championship by four points over Häkkinen, 70 to 66. Similarly, Ferrari held a four-point lead over McLaren in the Constructors' Championship, 118 to 114.

Classification

Qualifying

Race

Championship standings after the race
Bold text indicates who still had a theoretical chance of becoming World Champion.

Drivers' Championship standings

Constructors' Championship standings

References 

Malaysian Grand Prix
Malaysian Grand Prix
Grand Prix